The Women's Cathay Pacific Hong Kong Open 2014 is the women's edition of the 2014 Hong Kong Open, which is a WSA World Series event Gold (prize money: 77 000 $). The event took place in Hong Kong from 27 August to 31 August. Nicol David won her ninth Hong Kong Open trophy, beating Nour El Tayeb in the final.

Prize money and ranking points
For 2014, the prize purse was $77,000. The prize money and points breakdown is as follows:

Seeds

Draw and results

See also
Hong Kong Open (squash)
Men's Hong Kong squash Open 2014
WSA World Series 2014

References

Squash tournaments in Hong Kong
Women's Hong Kong Open (squash)
Women's Hong Kong Open (squash)
Hong Kong
August 2014 sports events in China